Lolo Butte is a summit in Deschutes County, Oregon, in the United States. with an elevation of  .

Lolo is a name derived from Chinook Jargon meaning pack or carry.

References

Buttes of Oregon
Mountains of Deschutes County, Oregon
Mountains of Oregon